Samuel Wright Jr. (November 25, 1848 – May 6, 1928) was an American professional baseball player. He played in Major League Baseball for a total of four seasons for the New Haven Elm Citys (1875), Boston Red Caps (1876, 1881), and Cincinnati Stars (1880).

In 45 games played, all as a shortstop, he batted .168, had 29 hits, four doubles, five RBIs, scored 10 runs, and one base on balls in 173 at bats. Two of his brothers also played in the majors: Baseball Hall of Famers Harry Wright and George Wright.

Wright was born in New York City to Samuel Wright Sr., a famous cricketer, and Sam's second wife, Ann Tone. He died at the age of 79 in Boston, Massachusetts. He is interred at St. Patrick Cemetery in Stoneham, Massachusetts.

References

External links

SABR project

Major League Baseball shortstops
New Haven Elm Citys players
Boston Red Caps players
Cincinnati Reds (1876–1879) players
Lowell (minor league baseball) players
New Bedford (minor league baseball) players
Baseball players from New York (state)
19th-century baseball players
1848 births
1928 deaths